Sanfo is a village in the Oury Department of Balé Province in southern Burkina Faso. As of 1996 the village had a total population of 557.

References

Populated places in the Boucle du Mouhoun Region